Sibolangit is a district or kecamatan in the Deli Serdang Regency in the Indonesian province of North Sumatra. As of the 2020 census, it had a population of 19,980 and an area of 179.96 km2.

It is the site of the Two Colors Sibolangit Waterfall.

On 26 September 1997, Garuda Indonesia Flight 152 crashed into woodlands in Sibolangit. On 16 May 2016, a total of 21 tourists were killed in Sibolangit when a flash flood struck them. 200 personnel were deployed by the Search and Rescue Agency.

Notable people
Likas Tarigan

References

Sumatra
Populated places in North Sumatra